Ruslan Tagirovich Khuchbarov (12 November 1972 – 3 September 2004), was an Ingush terrorist presumed to be a militant nicknamed "Polkovnik" (the Russian for Colonel) notorious for his leading role in the 2004 Beslan school hostage crisis.

Biography
Khuchbarov was an ethnic Ingush and native of the village of Galashki in the republic of Ingushetia. His body was reportedly identified after he was killed during the storming of the school. 

According to FSB information obtained by the Russian newspaper Vremya Novostey, Khuchbarov was living with his Russian girlfriend and their son in Oryol Oblast, until he was accused of murder and attempted murder of two members of the Armenian diaspora and declared wanted in 1998. Khuchbarov then went into hiding and moved to Chechnya, where he underwent extensive combat training in a camp of the field commander Ibragimov and took the nickname Colonel, collaborating with Arbi Barayev. Eventually he joined the brigade of Shamil Basayev and became one of his closest associates in Ingushetia. Khuchbarov and one other rebel, Amriev, were responsible for the Galashki ambush in Ingushetia on 11 May 2000, killing 18 soldiers and officers and wounding three. The bombing of the Ingushetian Department of the FSB on 15 September 2003, when three people died and 32 were seriously injured, has also been ascribed to Khuchbarov. He was involved in the training of suicide attackers.

Russian sources initially reported "Polkovnik" to be Ali Taziyev, a former Ingush policeman-turned-rebel who was declared legally dead in 2000. However, this was later refuted by the Russian prosecutors. Investigators then alleged this was the same person as Akhmed Yevloyev, an Ingush terrorist leader also said to be Ali Taziyev, but those reports were declared incorrect later: although he had similar features as Yevloyev, his facial profile was a lot different. In addition, Yevloyev turned out to be still alive.

References

1972 births
2004 deaths
Beslan hostagetakers
Ingush people
People of the Chechen wars